Semliki Airstrip , also Semuliki Airstrip, is an airstrip serving the Semliki Wildlife Reserve and Semliki National Park, in the Western Region of Uganda.

Location
Semliki Airstrip in located is Kabarole District, in Semliki Wildlife Reserve, in the Toro sub-region, in Western Uganda. The geographical coordinates of Semliki Airstrip are 0°53'45.0"N 30°21'09.0"E (Latitude:0.895833; Longitude:30.352500).

Overview
Semliki Airstrip is adjacent to Semliki Safari Lodge, within the nature reserve. Aircraft are allowed to land for a fee, collected by the Uganda Wildlife Authority. Transport to the Lodge by air, saves time and is less stressful than transport by automobile, on the narrow winding roads.

Airlines and destinations

See also
Transport in Uganda
List of airports in Uganda
List of airlines of Uganda

References

External links
Transportation in Uganda: Lonely Planet

Airports in Uganda
Kabarole District